The Memphis Grizzlies are an American professional basketball team based in Memphis, Tennessee. The Grizzlies play in the Southwest Division of the Western Conference of the National Basketball Association (NBA). The team was founded in Vancouver, British Columbia in 1995 along with the Toronto Raptors as part of the NBA's expansion into Canada. The Grizzlies and the Raptors became the first non-United States teams to join the NBA since 1946. The Grizzlies have played their home games at the FedExForum since 2004. The Grizzlies were owned by Michael Heisley and several locals including J. R. Hyde, Andy Cates, and Elliot Perry.

There have been 11 head coaches for the Grizzlies franchise. The franchise's first head coach was Brian Winters, who coached for two seasons. Lionel Hollins is the franchise's all-time leader in regular-season games coached (415), and the franchise's all-time leader in regular-season game wins (214). Hubie Brown is the only Grizzlies head coach to have won the NBA Coach of the Year Award. Brown was inducted into the Basketball Hall of Fame as a contributor, in 2005. Tony Barone and Marc Iavaroni have spent their entire NBA head coaching careers with the Grizzlies. Iavaroni was fired by the Grizzlies on January 22, 2009. Hollins was named as Iavaroni's successor, though Johnny Davis was the head coach for two games before Hollins' third term with the team. On May 7, 2016, Dave Joerger was fired by the Grizzlies. On May 29, 2016, David Fizdale was hired by the Grizzlies. Fizdale was fired on November 27, 2017.

Key

Coaches

Notes
 A person who has made a significant contribution to the game of basketball.
 A running total of the number of coaches of the Grizzlies. Thus, any coach who has two or more separate terms as head coach is only counted once.
 Each year is linked to an article about that particular NBA season.

References
General

Specific

Lists of National Basketball Association head coaches by team

Head coaches